Bojan Stamenković (born 14 November 1981) is a Serbian football midfielder who last played for FK Dubočica before retiring in 2017.

References

External links
 

1981 births
Living people
Sportspeople from Leskovac
Association football midfielders
Serbian footballers
FK Radnički Niš players
FK Zemun players
FK Radnički 1923 players
FK Napredak Kruševac players
FK Dinamo Vranje players
FK Banat Zrenjanin players
FK Timok players
FK Sileks players
Serbian SuperLiga players